Samsi (Nepali: साम्सी) is a rural municipality in Mahottari District in Province No. 2 of Nepal. Official website https://samsimun.gov.np/ It was formed in 2016 occupying current 7 sections (wards) from previous 7 former VDCs. It occupies an area of 21.57 km2 with a total population of 33,791.

References 

Populated places in Mahottari District
Rural municipalities of Nepal established in 2017
Rural municipalities in Madhesh Province